Lunéville (German, obsolete: Lünstadt ) is a commune in the northeastern French  department of Meurthe-et-Moselle.

It is a subprefecture of the department and lies on the river Meurthe at its confluence with the Vezouze.

History

Lunéville was a renowned resort in the 18th century, known as the capital of Lorraine. The grand Château de Lunéville, built in 1702 for Leopold, Duke of Lorraine to replace an older palace, was the residence of the duke of Lorraine until the duchy was annexed by France in 1766. The château was designed in the style of Versailles to satisfy Leopold's wife, Élisabeth Charlotte d'Orléans, the niece of Louis XIV, and became known as the "Versailles of Lorraine". It includes a chapel designed by Germain Boffrand. Leopold and his wife were the parents of Prince Charles Alexander of Lorraine and Francis I, Holy Roman Emperor (through him they were the grandparents of Marie Antoinette).

The last duke of Lorraine was Stanislaus I, the former king of Poland. A devout Catholic, an author and a philanthropist, Stanislaus had a church built and several follies in his gardens for the amusement and education of visiting Polish nobility and followers of the Enlightenment. The more famous visitors to his court were Voltaire, Jean-Jacques Rousseau, André Morellet, and Montesquieu. After the death of his father-in-law in 1766, Louis XV of France annexed the duchy and turned the castle into a barracks, but much of the original construction has survived, and what remains is open to the public and the château's intricate parterre gardens, designed by Yves Hours (a pupil of André Le Nôtre) in 1711 and Louis de Nesle in 1724, are a public park today.

It was over the nearby Parroy Forest, directly east of Lunéville, only some 11 months after the outbreak of World War I, that the first aerial victory by a fighter aircraft armed with a synchronised machine gun occurred on July 1, 1915, as the German Fliegertruppe officer Kurt Wintgens forced down an Aeronautique Militaire Morane-Saulnier L parasol monoplane.  Neither member of the French air crew was seriously wounded, while the French aircraft's Gnome Lambda engine received multiple hits to disable the aircraft.

Treaties
The Treaty of Lunéville was signed in the Treaty House, one of the houses built up against the château gardens of Lunéville on 9 February 1801, between the French Republic and the Austrian Empire by Count Ludwig von Cobenzl and Joseph Bonaparte.

Another treaty, signed in Germany, was the Treaty of Frankfurt (1871), which made Lunéville into a border town, attracting people from Alsace and Moselle who relocated to keep their French nationality. A new period of economic prosperity, known as the Belle Époque, restored some of the glory of Stanislas's ducal court of the 18th century.

Industry

Lunéville faience, a kind of unglazed faience produced from 1723 at Lunéville by Jacques Chambrette, became the Manufacture Royale du Roi de Pologne (“Royal Factory of the King of Poland”) after Stanislaus sponsored it in 1749. The earthenware first became famous for its detailed figurines and in the 20th century for its art deco designs, and it still exists today as "Terres d'Est".

In 1858, the glass factory of Croismare was built. It became famous when the Müller brothers settled there in 1897 and began creating Art Deco glass designs.

Louis Ferry-Bonnechaux discovered a technique using beads and sequins on embroidery in 1865. His craft was widely copied and became known as Lunéville Point, and its heritage can still be seen in modern haute couture.

A subsidiary of the Dietrich company, Lorraine-Dietrich moved to Lunéville after the 1871 treaty of Frankfurt. Today it is known for its trailers, but it started off as a manufacturer of cars and railway equipment.

Demographics 
The population of Lunéville in 2019 was 17,867.

Notable people
Stanisław I Leszczyński (1677–1766), King of Poland 1704-1709, 1733-1736 (reigned as Stanislaus I), then Duke of Lorraine until his death at Lunéville where he spent 30 years in exile.
 Muller Frères, an art nouveau glass production company
 Georges de La Tour lived in Lunéville for much of his career.

Lunéville was the birthplace of :
Nicolas Beatrizet, 16th century engraver
Prince Charles Alexander of Lorraine, 1712
François Nicolas Benoît, Baron Haxo, 1774 June 24
René Basset (1855–1924), orientalist 
Marie Bobillier (1858–1918), musicologist
Louis Émile Gratia (1878–1962), musicologist
Henri Basset (1892–1926), son of the above, linguist and historian 
André Basset (1895–1956), younger brother of the above, linguist, orientalist
Jean Bastien-Thiry, (1927–1963), attempted assassination of president de Gaulle

Geology
In 1874, a fossil Bennettitalean stem excavated from the area near the city was described as Cylindropodium liasinum by Saporta, which was reassigned in 2016 to the genus Cycadeoidea under Cycadeoidea cylindrica.

See also
Communes of the Meurthe-et-Moselle department

References

External links

Official website (in French)

Communes of Meurthe-et-Moselle
Subprefectures in France
Meurthe-et-Moselle communes articles needing translation from French Wikipedia
Duchy of Lorraine